The Bunny Man is an urban legend that originated from two incidents in Fairfax County, Virginia, in 1970, but has been spread throughout the Washington, D.C., and Maryland areas. The legend has many variations; most involve a man wearing a rabbit costume who attacks people with an axe or hatchet.

Most of the stories occur around Colchester Overpass, a Southern Railway overpass spanning Colchester Road near Clifton, Virginia, sometimes referred to as "Bunny Man Bridge".

Versions of the legend vary in the Bunny Man's name, motives, weapons, victims, description of the bunny costume or lack thereof, and sometimes even his possible death. In some accounts, victims' bodies are mutilated, and in some variations, the Bunny Man's ghost or aging spectre is said to come out of his place of death each year on Halloween to commemorate his passing.

Origin
Fairfax County Public Library Historian-Archivist Brian A. Conley extensively researched the Bunny Man legend. He has located two incidents of a man in a rabbit costume threatening people with an axe. The vandalism reports occurred ten days apart in 1970 in Burke, Virginia.
 
The first incident was reported the evening of October 19, 1970, by U.S. Air Force Academy Cadet Robert Bennett and his fiancée, who were visiting relatives on Guinea Road in Burke. Around midnight, while returning from a football game, they reportedly parked their car in a field on Guinea Road to "visit an Uncle who lived across the street from where the car was parked". As they sat in the front seat with the motor running, they noticed something moving outside the rear window. Moments later, the front passenger window was smashed, and there was a white-clad figure standing near the broken window. Bennett turned the car around while the man screamed at them about trespassing, including: "You're on private property, and I have your tag number." As they drove down the road, the couple discovered a hatchet on the car floor.

When the police requested a description of the man, Bennett insisted he was wearing a white suit with long bunny ears. However, Bennett's fiancée contested their assailant did not have bunny ears on his head, but was wearing a white capirote of some sort. They both remembered seeing his face clearly, but in the darkness, they could not determine his race. The police returned the hatchet to Bennett after examination.

The second reported sighting occurred on the evening of October 29, 1970, when construction security guard Paul Phillips approached a man standing on the porch of an unfinished home, in Kings Park West on Guinea Road. The man began chopping at a porch post with a long-handled axe, saying: "You are trespassing. If you come any closer, I'll chop off your head."

The Fairfax County Police opened investigations into both incidents, but both were eventually closed for lack of evidence. In the weeks following the incidents, more than 50 people contacted the police claiming to have seen the "Bunny Man". Several newspapers, including The Washington Post, reported that the "Bunny Man" had eaten a man's runaway cat. The  articles that mentioned this incident were:
 
"Man in Bunny suit Sought in Fairfax" (October 22, 1970)
"The 'Rabbit' Reappears" (October 31, 1970)
"Bunny Man Seen" (November 4, 1970)
"Bunny Reports Are Multiplying" (November 6, 1970)

In 1973, Patricia Johnson, a student at the University of Maryland, College Park, submitted a research paper that chronicled precisely 54 variations on the two incidents.

Colchester Overpass
Colchester Overpass was built in about 1906 near the site of Sangster's Station, a Civil War era railroad station on what was once the Orange and Alexandria Railroad. Because of its association with the legend, the overpass is a popular destination for paranormal enthusiasts (ghost hunters) and curiosity seekers (legend trippers). Interest increases around Halloween, and starting in 2003, local authorities began controlling access to the area during that time. During Halloween 2011, over 200 people, some from as far away as the Pennsylvania–Maryland state line, were turned away during a 14-hour traffic checkpoint into the area.

In popular culture

The 2011 slasher film Bunnyman is an exploitation-style version of the story.

The 2017 Amazon original series Lore, based on the podcast of the same name, uses the Bunny Man legend to introduce the second episode of Season 1.

In  episode "Let's Get Scared", host Chris Gethard dresses as the Bunny Man for the full episode.

In 2015, non-fiction author Jenny Cutler Lopez published a full-length feature in Northern Virginia Magazine (readership 100,000 plus) titled Long Live The Bunnyman.

On October 9, 2020, Adult Swim broadcast the story of the bunny man as a "bump" during an episode of Family Guy.

In 2021 MetaZoo Games LLC prints the card "Bunny Man" in the Cryptid Nation set.

See also 
 Donnie Darko
 Raymond Robinson (Green Man)
Madam Koi Koi

References

Further reading
The Bunny Man Unmasked: The Real Life Origins of an Urban Legend from Fairfax County Public Library
Bunny Man: Artist's Rendition from Braddock Heritage
Map: Braddock's Historic Sites from Braddock Heritage showing location of Bunny Man incidents

the description of "bunny suit" was removed, because it refers to what people wear to protect from biologic contamination, Cleanroom suit.

External links
Long Live The Bunnyman by Jenny Cutler Lopez in Northern Virginia Magazine (October 2015)
Tales of The Bunnyman of Northern Virginia from WeirdUS.com
The Clifton Bunny Man from Castle Of Spirits
The Legend of the Bunny Man from YouTube.com
Interview with the Bennetts from YouTube.com

1970 establishments in Virginia
Urban legends
Supernatural legends
Virginia folklore
Fairfax County, Virginia
Rabbits and hares in popular culture